Dan Pelson is an American media executive and a co-founder of several companies.

Biography
Pelson attended Colgate University and New York University’s Stern School of Business and began his career at Sun Microsystems. In 1995, he, along with Tom Livaccari and Carey Earle, co-founded Word Magazine, an early online magazine.

He also served as the Chief Executive Officer of Concrete Media, an internet services business, from 1998-2003. In 1996, under Concrete Media, he and Jane Mount co-founded Bolt.com, an early social networking site for teens. Pelson also served as the CEO of Bolt.

In 2006, he co-founded uPlayMe, a music-focused social network. Also in 2006, he was named the Senior Vice President, Global Consumer Marketing of Warner Music Group, and also served as the chief architect and executor of Warner’s strategic consumer initiatives. At Sony Music, he oversaw the Direct to Consumer global operations and was the CEO of MyPlay, Sony’s music video platform from 2008-2013. He also served as an executive producer of The X Factor Digital Experience. He is also a co-founder of SunPress Vinyl, a record pressing plant, and Brand Access, a provider of theme merchandise.

References

Living people
American media executives
American Internet company founders
American technology chief executives
American technology company founders
Year of birth missing (living people)